Lau Nau or Laura Naukkarinen (born 1980) is a composer, producer and musician from Finland. She plays also under the moniker Subatlantti, in IAX, a band formed with Kuupuu and Tsembla and is a visiting member of The Matti Bye Ensemble. She was also a member of free improv and psychedelic folk bands Kiila, Päivänsäde, the Anaksimandros, Avarus, Maailma, and the trio Hertta Lussu Ässä formed by fellow acid folk singer-songwriters Islaja and Kuupuu.

Besides of composing and producing her own albums, Lau Nau accompanies silent films live and composes music for feature films, theatre plays, dance and sound installations. Her instrumentation ranges from everyday objects to classical instruments and analog synthesizers.

She composed the soundtrack to the 2019 movie Land Without God, directed by Mannix Flynn.

Lau Nau lives in the Finnish countryside of Kimito island with her husband and two sons.

Discography
Kuutarha (Locust, 2005)
Nukkuu (Locust, 2008)
Valohiukkanen, (Fonal, 2012)
Hem. Någonstans (Fonal, 2015)
Poseidon (Fonal, Beacon Sound, Yacca, 2017)

References

External links
launau.com
Locust Records

1980 births
Living people
21st-century Finnish women singers
Finnish songwriters
Singers from Helsinki
Psychedelic folk musicians
Women in electronic music
Locust Music artists